HMS Lysander was a  destroyer that served with the Royal Navy during the First World War. Launched in August 1913 as HMS Ulysses, the ship was renamed the following month under an Admiralty order to become one of the first in what would be the norm, a class of destroyers named after successive letters of the alphabet. On commissioning, the vessel joined the Third Destroyer Flotilla and operated as part of the Harwich Force. In 1916, the destroyer was involved in action with German battlecruisers following the bombardment of Yarmouth and Lowestoft  but escaped unharmed, and rescued the survivors from the Canadian hospital ship  in 1918. With the cessation of hostilities, the ship was placed in reserve and sold to be broken up in June 1922.

Design and development

Lysander was one of twenty-two L- or  destroyers built for the Royal Navy, and one of two ordered from Swan Hunter on 29 March 1912. The design followed the preceding  but with improved seakeeping properties and armament, including twice the number of torpedo tubes.

The ship's complement was 73 officers and ratings.

Armament consisted of three single QF  Mk IV guns on the ship's centreline, with one on the forecastle, one aft and one between the funnels. One single  Maxim gun was carried. A single 2-pounder  "pom-pom" anti-aircraft gun was later added. Torpedo armament consisted of two twin mounts for  torpedoes mounted aft. Capacity to lay four Vickers Elia Mk.4 mines was included, but the facility was never used.

Construction and career
Built under the 1912–1913 Programme and originally named Ulysses, the ship was laid down by Swan Hunter at Wallsend on the River Tyne on 8 August 1912. The ship was launched on 18 August 1913 and completed on 9 December 1913, but in the interim had been renamed Lysander by Admiralty order on 30 September 1913. This was the first time that the Navy had used the name Lysander in the century, recalling the Spartan military leader. Originally part of a class named after characters in Shakespeare's plays and the Waverley novels by Sir Walter Scott, the destroyer joined what was to be the first in a new way of naming classes of warships, with each class of destroyers named after a successive letter of the alphabet.

On commissioning, the newly renamed Lysander joined the Third Destroyer Flotilla as part of the Harwich Force. After the British entry into the First World War on 4 August 1914,  the flotilla was tasked with harassing the Imperial German Navy and on 26 August was ordered to attack German torpedo boats on their patrol as part of a large Royal Navy fleet in what was to be the Battle of Heligoland Bight. Lysander was third in the line when their pursuit brought them to the light cruiser , which swiftly brought in a barrage of fire against the British vessels. The cruiser hit all three of the other destroyers, but Lysander avoided both substantial damage by shells and colliding with Liberty by responding quickly to the helm. Despite being outgunned, the destroyer returned fire, expending 93 rounds of ammunition. The arrival of the light cruisers of the First Light Cruiser Squadron turned the tide and the British forces overwhelmed the German ship.

However, the attack was aborted due to the poor weather, with few of the seaplanes getting airborne and those which did failing to reach the objective. On 2–3 November 1914, Lysander was part of a patrol of four destroyers led by the light cruiser  from Harwich to off Terschelling which narrowly missed encountering a German force of battlecruisers and cruisers on the way to bombard and lay mines off the town of Great Yarmouth.

On 23 January 1915, the destroyer formed part of the First Division of the Third Flotilla during the Battle of Dogger Bank. The flotilla was incapable of keeping sufficient speed to engage in the battle, which was left to newer and faster  destroyers. While the net-layers then returned to base, the two destroyers patrolled the nets, and were unsuccessfully bombed by German aircraft the next day before returning to port. In June 1915, most of the Harwich Force, including Lysander was employed in anti-submarine operations at the west end of the English Channel, covering the arrival of troops from Canada and the despatch of troops to the Dardanelles campaign.

From 28 July to 31 July 1915, cruisers and destroyers from the Grand Fleet and Harwich Force carried out Operation C, a large scale sweep into the Skagerrak with the intent of disrupting sea trade between Sweden and Germany. Lysander detained one Danish merchant ship, the Cito which was thought to be acting suspiciously, and escorted the steamer to the Humber for further examination. Lysander formed part of the covering force for minelaying operations on 16–18 August and 11 September. The Third Flotilla, including Lysander, was renumbered the Ninth Destroyer Flotilla on 4 September that year, although it remained as part of the Harwich Force.

On 24 April 1916, a force of German battlecruisers and cruisers set out from Kiel to bombard the coastal towns of Lowestoft and Yarmouth. Later that day, the German battlecruiser  struck a mine, and the resultant radio traffic warned the British of the German operation. The Harwich Force, including Lysander left port at midnight on the night of 24/25 April. The German battlecruisers aborted their bombardment of Yarmouth to engage the Harwich force, hitting the cruiser  and the destroyer  but retired to the East rather than attempt to destroy the smaller British force. Lysander was undamaged.

By April 1917, the destroyer had moved to the Seventh Destroyer Flotilla operating on the East coat of Britain. The vessel was then transferred to Devonport with the Fourth Destroyer Flotilla by August 1917, with the Flotilla being employed in convoy escort duties. On 29 June 1918, Lysander found the 24 remaining survivors from the Canadian hospital ship  which had been sunk by  the previous day; they became critical to a case at the Leipzig War Crimes Trials. After the Armistice of 11 November 1918 that ended the war, the Royal Navy returned to a peacetime level of strength and both the number of ships and the amount of personnel in service needed to be reduced to save money. Lysander was initially placed in reserve at Plymouth alongside over 49 other destroyers. On 9 June 1922, the vessel was sold to Cashmore of Newport, Wales, and was subsequently broken up.

Pennant numbers

References

Citations

Bibliography

 
 
 
 
 
 
 
 
 
 
 
 
 
 
 
 
 

 

 
 
  

1913 ships
Lysander
Ships built on the River Clyde
Lysander